White Oaks Mall is a shopping center in Springfield, Illinois, United States.  It is located at the junction of Illinois Route 4 (Veterans Parkway) and Wabash Avenue.  With  of retail space, it is the largest enclosed shopping center in Central Illinois. The mall's anchor stores are Macy's, Michaels, LA Fitness, and Dick's Sporting Goods. There are 2 vacant anchor stores that were once Bergner's and Sears.

History
The mall is located on the southwest side of Springfield, approximately five miles (8 km) southwest of the traditional city center. Construction started in 1974 and opened in 1977. Stix Baer & Fuller was an original anchor store, but it was closed in 1982 and sold to Kohl's when the former chain decided to close all operations outside its primary market of St. Louis, Missouri. At the time, this move coincided with rumors that Kohl's would also be operating a location at Hickory Point Mall in Forsyth, Illinois.

In the early 1990s, it underwent a $14 million renovation which included the addition of a new food court. A carousel was installed in 1997.

White Oaks Mall houses over 100 stores. Its operator, the Simon Property Group, which owns 80.7% of the mall, describes White Oaks Mall as a "super-regional shopping mall".  The mall shares its name with the White Oak, the state tree of Illinois.

The original planned name of the mall was Westroads Mall.  Ed McMahon and Billy Carter attended the grand opening held on August 24, 1977.

White Oaks Mall has a children's play area.  Children's Place and Carter's specialize in juvenile clothing.

Two major closure announcements were made in 2018.  In April, it was announced that Bergner's would be closing around July 2018 as part of a plan to close all stores nationwide. In May, it was announced that Sears would be closing its White Oaks store in September 2018 as part of a plan to close 78 stores nationwide. After Bergner's and Sears closed, Macy's became the only traditional-sized anchor store doing business at White Oaks.

Anchors
Macy's (originally Famous-Barr, became Macy's in 2006) Still open

Former anchors
Bergner's  (originally Myers Brothers, became Bergner's in 1982) Closed in 2018
Montgomery Ward  Ceased operations in 2001. The former anchor space was later split among Dick's Sporting Goods, Cost Plus World Market, and Linens 'n Things. After the latter two closed in 2008, the Linens 'n Things space became occupied by hhgregg, and later Michaels, while the Cost Plus space became occupied by LA Fitness.
Sears, Roebuck and Company closed in 2018, last original anchor to close
Stix, Baer and Fuller 1977-1982, became Kohl's upon liquidation
Kohl's Nov 4, 1982-1992, moved to White Oaks Plaza

Refitting
The Illinois Department of Central Management Services, the custodian of Illinois state government real estate, confirmed a report in December 2020 that the state had purchased the Sears anchor store building, with its approximately 120,000 square feet of space, with the intent of redeveloping the footprint as office space for three state departments.  The Illinois Department of Innovation and Technology, the Illinois Environmental Protection Agency, and the Illinois Pollution Control Board were said to be planning the move.

References

External links
Mall website
Corporate website

Shopping malls in Illinois
Simon Property Group
Buildings and structures in Springfield, Illinois
Tourist attractions in Springfield, Illinois
Shopping malls established in 1977
1977 establishments in Illinois